Amerila syntomina is a moth of the subfamily Arctiinae. It was described by Arthur Gardiner Butler in 1878. It is found in Benin, Cameroon, the Democratic Republic of the Congo, Ghana, Guinea, Ivory Coast, Nigeria, Sierra Leone and Tanzania.

Subspecies
Amerila syntomina syntomina
Amerila syntomina rubondoi Häuser & Boppre, 1997 (Tanzania)

References

 , 1878: Descriptions of some new genera and species of Lepidoptera from Old Calabar and Madagascar. Annals and Magazine of Natural History (5) 2: 455-465.
 , 1887: Description of some new species of Lepidoptera Heterocera, mostly from Tropical Africa. Proceedings of the Scientific Meetings of the Zoological Society of London 1887: 668-686, pl. LV.
 , 1997: A revision of the Afrotropical taxa of the genus Amerila Walker (Lepidoptera, Arctiidae). Systematic Entomology 22 (1): 1-44.

Moths described in 1878
Amerilini
Insects of Cameroon
Moths of Africa
Insects of West Africa